Nelson Wallulatum (February 27, 1926 – June 13, 2010) was a Native American chief and leader of the Wasco tribe of Warm Springs, Oregon. He was a serviceman in the US Navy from 1943 to 1945. He was the Wasco representative on the Warm Springs tribal council from 1959 up until his death in 2010.

References

1926 births
2010 deaths
Native American leaders
United States Navy sailors
United States Navy personnel of World War II
People from Wasco County, Oregon